Lisa Howarth is a retired British professional kickboxer who is a former World Kickboxing Association champion.

Personal life

Dakota Ditcheva is a professional muay thai fighter and daughter of Lisa Howarth.

Titles
1995 – WKA Super Bantamweight Muay Thai World Title
1993 – Full Contact Karate World Title
1987 – IFCF Bantamweight World Title
1987 – WKA Super Flyweight World Title (1 Defence)

Kickboxing record

|-
|-  bgcolor="c5d2ea"
| 2001-11-04 || Draw ||align=left| Ilonka Elmont || || Amsterdam, Netherlands || Draw ||  || || 
|-
|- bg color="FFBBBB"
|- 1999-01-29 || Lose||aligh=left| Alicia Ashley || || Atlantic City, New Jersey || Decision || 6 ||  ||
|-
! style=background:white colspan=9 |
|-  bgcolor="CCFFCC"
| 1997-06-19 || Win ||align=left| Chantal Nadon || || Toronto, Ontario, Canada || Decision || 6 ||  || 
|-
|-  bgcolor="FFBBBB"
| 1995-05-30 || Loss ||align=left| Naoko Kumagai || || Tokyo, Japan || KO || 1 ||  || 
|-
! style=background:white colspan=9 |
|-  bgcolor="CCFFCC"
| 1994-06-03 || Win ||align=left| Nora Daigle || || Atlantic City, New Jersey, USA || KO || 1 ||  || 
|-
|-  bgcolor="c5d2ea"
| 1994-02-04 || Draw ||align=left| Bonnie Canino || || USA || Draw ||  ||  || 
|-
|-  bgcolor="CCFFCC"
| 1993-11-12 || Win ||align=left| Nancy Joseph || || Milan, Italy || Points || 10 || 2:00 || 
|-
! style=background:white colspan=9 |
|-  bgcolor="CCFFCC"
| 1993-10-22 || Win ||align=left| Bonnie Canino || || Atlantic City, New Jersey, USA || Points || 10 || 2:00 || 
|-
|-  bgcolor="CCFFCC"
| 1992-08-00 || Win ||align=left| Zelda Tekin || || Belgium || KO || 5 || || 
|-
! style=background:white colspan=9 |
|-  bgcolor="c5d2ea"
| 1991-04-21 || Draw ||align=left| Michele Aboro || || London, England || Draw ||  || || 
|-
|-  bgcolor="c5d2ea"
| 1991-00-00 || NC ||align=left| Naoko Kumagai || || Birmingham, England || No Contest ||  ||  || 
|-
|-  bgcolor="CCFFCC"
| 1990-03-24 || Win ||align=left| Florence Suire || || Oldham, England || Points ||  ||  || 
|-
|-  bgcolor="CCFFCC"
| 1990-02-03 || Win ||align=left| Kathy Long || || London, England || Points || 3 || 3:00 || 
|-
|-  bgcolor="CCFFCC"
| 1987-00-00 || Win ||align=left| Yolanda Mol || || England || Points || 3 ||  || 
|-
! style=background:white colspan=9 |
|-  bgcolor="CCFFCC"
| 1987-07-12 || Win ||align=left| Claudia || || Manchester, England || TKO || 3 ||  || 
|-
|-  bgcolor="CCFFCC"
| 1986-11-23 || Win ||align=left| Dayle Baykey || || London, England || Points || 7 || 2:00 || 
|-
! style=background:white colspan=9 |
|-  bgcolor="CCFFCC"
| 1986-00-00 || Win ||align=left| Cathy Paschy || || London, England || Points ||  || || 
|-
|-  bgcolor="CCFFCC"
| 1986-00-00 || Win ||align=left| Sandra De Vries || ||  ||  ||  || || 
|-
|-
| colspan=9 | Legend:

Professional boxing record

References

People from Sale, Greater Manchester
Female Muay Thai practitioners
Living people
English women boxers
English female kickboxers
Year of birth missing (living people)
Flyweight kickboxers
Bantamweight kickboxers